Giasson is a surname. Notable people with the surname include:

Benoît Giasson (born 1964), Canadian fencer
Daniel Giasson (born 1987), Brazilian-born Italian futsal player
Jean-Louis Giasson (1939–2014), Canadian Roman Catholic bishop

See also
Glasson (surname)